Jeffrey Virgil Neral (born 9 December 1997) is a Dutch professional footballer who plays as a defender for Rupel Boom.

Club career
As a youth, Neral played for a number of football academies, including those of Feyenoord, Excelsior and Sparta Rotterdam. He signed a professional contract with the latter in 2015, and made his debut on 18 October 2015 in a match vs. FC Oss. He won the Eerste Divisie trophy in 2016 and celebrated the club's promotion to the top flight. He then was assigned to the reserve team, Jong Sparta, where he played the remainder of his contract in the Tweede Divisie. In January 2018 he was released from his contract.

In November 2018, Neral joined amateur Derde Divisie side SteDoCo, but left the club after making two appearances to undergo trial with Slovak side AS Trenčín, without however signing a contract with the club. Neral returned to the Netherlands to again undergo a trial period at Excelsior Maassluis, but did not play for the remainder of the 2018−19 season. In June 2019, he joined Eerste Divisie side Helmond Sport.

During the summer transfer window of 2020, Conraad left his home country and joined Greek second-division club Ergotelis on a free transfer.

Personal life
Born in the Netherlands, Neral is of Surinamese descent.

Career statistics

Club

Honours
Sparta Rotterdam
Eerste Divisie: 2015–16

References

External links
 
 

1997 births
Living people
Association football forwards
Dutch footballers
Dutch sportspeople of Surinamese descent
Sparta Rotterdam players
Helmond Sport players
Ergotelis F.C. players
Eerste Divisie players
Tweede Divisie players
Derde Divisie players
Super League Greece 2 players
Footballers from Rotterdam
K. Rupel Boom F.C. players